The Episcopal Diocese of Texas is one of the dioceses of the Episcopal Church in the United States of America. The diocese consists of all Episcopal congregations in the southeastern quartile of Texas, including the cities of Austin, Beaumont, Galveston, Houston (the see city), Waco and, as of July, 2022 Fort Worth, and other cities within the former diocese of The Episcopal Church in North Texas.

The 166 congregations in the Diocese of Texas have ministries, locally and abroad. They include: homeless and feeding ministries, clinics, after school programs for at risk youth, ministry to seniors, ESL and citizenship classes and much more. Two new churches, St. Julian of Norwich (Austin) and St. Mary Magdalene (Manor) were planted in 2010.

Institutions of the diocese include; St. Vincent's House, a social service agency, in Galveston; St. David's Hospital, a healthcare system, in Austin; El Buen Samaritano, an agency to help working poor in Austin; COTS/LOTS, Community of the Streets, outreach to homeless men and women in midtown Houston; Episcopal High School, Houston; St. Andrew's Episcopal School, Austin; and the Seminary of the Southwest in Austin.

The diocese traces its foundation to Christ Church in Matagorda in 1838, when it became the first foreign missionary field of the Episcopal Church (as part of the Republic of Texas). Together with Christ Church, Houston (1839) and Trinity Church, Galveston (1841) it formed the Episcopal Church of Texas, the Episcopal presence in the Republic of Texas. It formally became a diocese of the Episcopal Church in 1849. The diocese expanded to include the territory of the Episcopal Church in North Texas in 2022.

Christ Church became the cathedral of the diocese in 1949. The current bishop is C. Andrew Doyle (born 1966).  He succeeded Don Wimberly as diocesan on June 7, 2009, upon Wimberly's retirement.

Previous bishops
Missionary Bishops of Texas include: Leonidas Polk and George Washington Freeman (until Texas was admitted to the Union in 1845). The diocese organized in 1849 and elected Alexander Gregg its first bishop in 1859. He served until 1893 when his coadjutor (elected to succeed), George Herbert Kinsolving, became Bishop of Texas. Kinsolving's coadjutor, Clinton Simon Quin, succeeded him 35 years later in 1928.

John Hines served as bishop coadjutor under Quin for ten years and became diocesan in 1955. Nine years later, in 1964, Hines was elected Presiding Bishop of the Episcopal Church where he served for a decade. James Milton Richardson was consecrated the fifth Bishop of Texas on February 10, 1965, and served as diocesan until his death in 1980. The sixth Bishop of Texas, Maurice M. Benitez, was elected in 1980. In June 1993 Claude E. Payne was elected the fourth bishop coadjutor of the Diocese of Texas and became the seventh Bishop of Texas February 10, 1995. Don Wimberly became the eighth bishop of Texas in June, 2003, retiring at the mandatory age of 72 on June 6, 2009.  Doyle, elected in May, 2008, was consecrated at St. Martins, Houston, on November 22, 2008, and invested and seated on June 7, 2009.

Additionally, Texas has had nine bishops suffragan and six assistant bishops since becoming a diocese: F. Percy Goddard, James P. Clements, and Roger Howard Cilley; Scott Field Bailey; Gordon T. Charlton; William E. Sterling Sr., Leopoldo J. Alard, and Rayford B. High Jr. served as bishops suffragan. Dena Harrison served as bishop suffragan for the central region of the diocese; she was the thirteenth woman consecrated to the episcopate in the Episcopal Church and the first in a diocese in the South. She was succeeded by Kathryn "Kai" Ryan in 2019. Jeff W. Fisher was elected bishop suffragan for the east Texas region of the diocese on June 2, 2012, following the retirement of Rayford High in 2011. Anselmo Carral, William J. Cox, Don Wimberly, James B. Brown, Ted Daniels and John Buchanan have served as assistant bishops.

Bishops of Texas

Suffragan Bishops of Texas

Schools

 Ascension Episcopal School, Houston (PN-8)
 All Saints Episcopal School, Beaumont (PN-8)
 All Saints Episcopal School, Tyler (PK-12)
 Calvary Episcopal School, Richmond (PK-12)
 Episcopal High School, Bellaire
 Grace Episcopal School, Georgetown
 Holy Spirit Episcopal School, Houston (PK-8)
 Holy Trinity Episcopal School, Harris County (PK-8)
 St. Francis Episcopal School, Piney Point Village (PN-12)
 St. James the Apostle Episcopal School, Conroe (I-PK)
 St. Stephen's Episcopal School, Austin
 St. Stephen's Episcopal School, Houston (PN-12)
 St. Thomas' Episcopal School, Houston (K-12)
 St. Thomas the Apostle Episcopal School, Nassau Bay (PK-5)
 St. Mark's Episcopal School, Houston (PN-8)
 St. Andrew's Episcopal School, Austin (K-12)
 Trinity Episcopal Day School, The Woodlands (2-PK)
 Trinity School of Texas, Longview (PK-12)

See also

 Christianity in Houston

References

External links
Diocesan website
Seminary of the Southwest
Journal of the Annual Convention, Diocese of Texas

Texas
Episcopal Church in Texas
Religious organizations established in 1849
Anglican dioceses established in the 19th century
1849 establishments in Texas
Province 7 of the Episcopal Church (United States)